Fredy Peccerelli (born 1971), a forensic anthropologist, is the director and one of the founding members of the Guatemalan Forensic Anthropology Foundation in Guatemala City, a nongovernmental organization that exhumes mass graves of victims of Guatemala's civil war. Peccerelli, along with members of his immediate family, has been the subject of repeated death threats as a result of his work.

In 1999, he was chosen by CNN and Time magazine as one of the "50 Latin American Leaders for the New Millennium".

In addition to his ongoing work in Guatemala, Peccerelli has conducted exhumations of mass graves in post-war Bosnia and Herzegovina. He testified about this work at the International Criminal Tribunal for the Former Yugoslavia on 13 March 2007.

References

External links
 
 A Guatemalan Returns to Help Find the 'Disappeared', summary of radio interview by Michele Kelemen on National Public Radio (full audio interview available). Original air date 15 June 2006, accessed 16 June 2008.
 Brief biography from the American Association for the Advancement of Science, accessed 16 June 2008.
 A Conversation with: Fredy Peccerelli; 'The Bones Tell the Story': Revealing History's Darker Days interview in The New York Times by Claudia Dreifus on 30 March 2004, accessed 16 June 2008.

1971 births
Living people
Guatemalan human rights activists
Guatemalan anthropologists
Forensic anthropologists